Harald Bjørkøy is a Norwegian tenor from Trondheim, Norway. He made his debut in 1982 and has since then been singing concerts in Europe and in the USA. In 1991 he made his debut at Weill Recital Hall at Carnegie Hall, New York City. He is a professor of music at the Grieg Academy at the University of Bergen, has appeared with many of the Norwegian Symphony Orchestras and has been a guest in main roles at the Norwegian Opera.

External links
 biography of Harald Bjørkøy at pro arte international management

Academic staff of the University of Bergen
University of Bergen alumni
Living people
Year of birth missing (living people)